Rana Dutta (born 15 May 1989) is an Indian first-class cricketer who plays for Tripura. In October 2016 in the 2016–17 Ranji Trophy, he took a hat-trick against Himachal Pradesh.

See also
 List of hat-tricks in the Ranji Trophy

References

External links
 

1989 births
Living people
Indian cricketers
Tripura cricketers
Cricketers from Tripura